Donald Farley (4 June 1970 – 19 November 2016) was a Canadian  cross-country skier who competed for his home nation in the 1998 Winter Olympics and in the 2002 Winter Olympics.

References

1970 births
2016 deaths
Canadian male cross-country skiers
Olympic cross-country skiers of Canada
Cross-country skiers at the 1998 Winter Olympics
Cross-country skiers at the 2002 Winter Olympics